In architecture, entasis is the application of a convex curve to a surface for aesthetic purposes. Its best-known use is in certain orders of Classical columns that curve slightly as their diameter is decreased from the bottom upward. It also may serve an engineering function regarding strength.

Etymology
The word we apply to the design principle is used by the Roman architectural historian Vitruvius, and derives from the Greek word έντείνω (enteino), "to stretch or strain tight". Creating the illusion of greater strength or perception of height may have been an objective in the application of entasis.

Examples

Examples of this design principle may be found in cultures throughout the world, from ancient times to contemporary architecture. The first use of entasis is probably in the Later Temple of Aphaia at Aigina, in the 490s B.C.

It also may be observed among Classical period Greek column designs, for example, in the Doric order temples in Segesta, Selinus, Agrigento, and Paestum.

It was used less frequently in Hellenistic and Roman period architecture. The Roman temples built during these periods were higher than those of the Greeks, with longer and thinner columns.

Chinese carpenters of the Song Dynasty followed designs in the AD 1103 Yingzao Fashi (Treatise on Architectural Methods or State Building Standards) that specified straight columns or those with an entasis on the upper third of the shaft.

Noted architects, such as the Renaissance master Andrea Palladio, also used entasis in the designs of their buildings.

Entasis was often a feature of Inca walls and double-jamb doorways, where they also act to counteract the optical illusion that would make the doorway appear narrower in the middle of its slope, than it really would be.

It also may be seen in the sloping or battered walls of some Tibetan monastery and fortress architecture, as well as that of Bhutan. The lower parts of these walls, approximately one third, have a slight inward curve, but the higher parts are straight. If one builds a whole wall as a straight, sloping surface, it appears to bulge outward. An example in Bhutan is the Dobji dzong. When some collapsed walls of the Punakha dzong were rebuilt, around 1996, this wisdom about optical perceptions appears to have been overlooked or unknown to the restorers and, the rebuilt walls, being straight, appear to bulge, according to Chris Butters, the author of The Treasure Revealer of Bhutan, Bibliotheca Himalayica, 1995.

In calligraphy and typography entasis refers to the thinning in the waist of a stroke, brought about either by a slight heightening of the pen or brush angle and/or by an increase in the speed of the stroke as it goes into a straight. Visually it is reminiscent of the structure of a bone and a stroke is seen as stronger for it. Entasis in a stroke is intended to counter the illusion a stroke with perfectly straight sides has of bulging slightly.

Conjecture about Greek columns

The early Classical builders did not leave an explanation of their reasons for using entasis in their columns. Extensive conjecture about the purpose of its application by them exists.

An early view, often articulated and still widespread, espoused by Hero of Alexandria, is that entasis corrects the optical illusion of concavity in the columns that the fallible human eye would create if the correction were not made.  This view, however, does not explain the case of one well-known example, at Paestum on the western coast of Italy, where the entasis is so pronounced that it creates an obvious curvature, not an illusion of straightness.

Some descriptions of entasis, state simply, that the technique was an enhancement applied to the more primitive conical columns to make them appear more substantial. Other descriptions argue that the technique emphasizes the substantiality of, not the columns, but rather, of some other part or of the building while being viewed as a whole. Yale architectural historian Vincent Scully argues that entasis emphasizes the weight of the roof of a building by making the building columns appear to bulge under the pressure distributed among them. Danish architect Steen Eiler Rasmussen believed that the effect represented strength by imitating the swelling of a strained muscle, a theory that accords well with the etymology of the word, from the Greek meaning "to strain".

It also has been argued that a "stunted cycloid" column that bulges in the middle is stronger structurally than is a column whose diameter changes according to a linear progression, therefore, having a sound engineering purpose. Because their discussion of the application of the principle has never been discovered, it is unknown, however, whether the early Greeks knew this.

If the column originally was a cultural reference to, or analogous to, the palm tree, the "bulge" is an accurate representation of the palm tree trunk. That could account for the replication of an observed principle in nature that became a tradition.

Literature

See also
 Glossary of architecture

References

Columns and entablature
Optical illusions